Margo (born María Marguerita Guadalupe Teresa Estela Bolado Castilla y O'Donnell, May 10, 1917 – July 17, 1985) was a Mexican-American actress and dancer. She appeared in many American film, stage, and television productions, including Lost Horizon (1937), The Leopard Man (1943), Viva Zapata! (1952), and I'll Cry Tomorrow (1955). She married actor Eddie Albert in 1945 and was later known as Margo Albert.

Early life and career
Margo was born into a musically talented family in Mexico City in 1917. As a child, she trained as a dancer with Eduardo Cansino, the father of Rita Hayworth. At the age of nine, she began dancing professionally with her uncle Xavier Cugat and his band in performances at Mexican nightclubs. Margo travelled to the United States as a child, living in New York City with her aunt, singer Carmen Castillo. While accompanying her uncle's band during a performance at the Waldorf Astoria in New York City, Margo was noticed by producer and director Ben Hecht and screenwriter Charles MacArthur, who cast the 17-year-old performer as the lead in their film Crime Without Passion. Margo also played the character of Miriamne Esdras both on stage and in the 1936 film version of Winterset, which one critic called a "cinemagoer's must." Other notable roles in the 1930s include parts in the 1937 film Lost Horizon and Broadway productions of Maxwell Anderson's Masque of Kings (1937) and Sidney Kingsley's The World We Make (1939).

Blacklisting 
While Margo continued to act in films until the 1960s, her career was curtailed by the television blacklist that began in 1950, with the targeting of Gypsy Rose Lee, Jean Muir, Hazel Scott, and Ireene Wicker. Margo was known for her progressive political views, but she was not a member of the Communist Party. In 1950, her name and that of her husband were published in Red Channels, an anti-Communist pamphlet that purported to expose Communist influence within the entertainment industry. Red Channels labeled her a communist because of her support for the Hollywood Ten, her advocacy for peace, and her support for refugees.

In 1964, she played the role of Selena in the Rawhide episode "A Man called Mushy".

Albert's son spoke of his parents' blacklisting in an interview published in December 1972, crediting Albert's service during World War II with ultimately saving his career.

Eddie Albert's film career survived the blacklist, but Margo was blacklisted by the major Hollywood studios.

Arts activism and engagement 
In the years after the blacklist, Margo pursued her advocacy for arts and education. In 1970, along with Frank Lopez, a trade union activist, Margo founded Plaza de la Raza (Place of the People) in East Los Angeles. A cultural center for arts and education, Plaza de la Raza remains in operation today, providing year-round programming in arts education. Her work with Plaza de la Raza included serving as the artistic director and as chairwoman of the board. Albert's commitment to the arts extended beyond her work in East Los Angeles: she served as a steering committee member on the President's Committee on the Arts and Humanities and was a member of the board of the National Council of the National Endowment for the Arts.

Personal life and death
Margo was married twice. In 1937, she wed actor Francis Lederer, but they divorced in 1940. In December 1945, three years after she became a naturalized citizen of the United States, she married actor Eddie Albert. Albert and she had two children, a son (actor Edward Albert) and an adopted daughter (Maria Carmen Zucht, who served as her father's business manager). The couple remained together for 40 years, until 1985, when she died from brain cancer at age 68 in their home in Pacific Palisades, California. Her gravesite is in Westwood Memorial Park in Los Angeles.

Stage work 
 September 25, 1935 – March 1936: Winterset
 February 8, 1937 – April 24, 1937: The Masque of Kings
 November 20, 1939 – January 27, 1940: The World We Make
 February 4, 1941 – February 23, 1941: Tanyard Street 
 December 6, 1944 – October 27, 1945: A Bell for Adano

Filmography 
This filmography of theatrical features is believed to be complete.

1934: Crime Without Passion
1935: Rumba
1936: The Robin Hood of El Dorado
1936: Winterset
1937: Lost Horizon
1939: El Milagro de la calle mayor
1939: Miracle on Main Street
1943: The Leopard Man
1943: Behind the Rising Sun
1943: Gangway for Tomorrow
1952: Viva Zapata! as Soldadera
1955: I'll Cry Tomorrow as Selma
1957: Wagon Train as Mrs. John Darro
1958: From Hell to Texas as Mrs. Bradley
1962: Who's Got the Action? as Roza
1970: Diary of a Mad Housewife as Valma

See also

 List of women identified as communists in Red Channels

References

External links

Margo Albert family information

1917 births
1985 deaths
Mexican film actresses
Actresses from Mexico City
Mexican emigrants to the United States
People from Pacific Palisades, California
Deaths from brain cancer in the United States
Deaths from cancer in California
Burials at Westwood Village Memorial Park Cemetery
Mexican people of Irish descent
Hollywood blacklist
American film actresses
20th-century American actresses
Naturalized citizens of the United States